Exhibition Park may refer to:

Exhibition Park (Lethbridge)
Exhibition Park, Newcastle
Exhibition Park in Canberra, Australia
Exhibition Place in Toronto, Canada